Fabricius is a lunar impact crater that is located within the northeast part of the walled plain Janssen. Attached to the north-northwest rim is the slightly larger crater Metius. Fabricius has multiple central peaks that rise to 0.8 km, with a rugged rise to the northwest running north–south. The rim is lumpy and somewhat distended, most noticeably to the southwest and south. It is 78 kilometers in diameter and 2,500 meters deep. It is from the Eratosthenian period, 3.2 to 1.1 billion years ago. It is named after David Fabricius, a 16th-century German astronomer.

Satellite craters
By convention these features are identified on lunar maps by placing the letter on the side of the crater midpoint that is closest to Fabricius.

References

Impact craters on the Moon
Eratosthenian